Laslo Seleš (Hungarian: László Széles, Serbian Cyrillic: Лacлo Ceлeш ; born 23 June 1943 in Zrenjanin) is a retired Yugoslavian football player who played with FK Proleter Zrenjanin and FK Željezničar Sarajevo in the Yugoslav First League and Sochaux in France.

References
Marc Barreaud, Dictionnaire des footballeurs étrangers du championnat professionnel français (1932-1997), L'Harmattan, 1997.

1943 births
Living people
Sportspeople from Zrenjanin
Hungarians in Vojvodina
Serbian footballers
Yugoslav footballers
FK Proleter Zrenjanin players
FK Željezničar Sarajevo players
FC Sochaux-Montbéliard players
Ligue 1 players
Association football defenders